Montañade Yoro National Park (previously named Montaña de Yoro National Park) is a national park in Honduras. It was established on 1 January 1987 and covers an area of 154.8 square kilometres. It has an altitude of between 1,800 and 2,245 metres.

References

National parks of Honduras
Protected areas established in 1987
Central American Atlantic moist forests